Michael Valentine MacKenzie (born 13 September 1983 in Windhoek) is a Namibian rugby union player. He plays as a prop.

MacKenzie had 8 caps for Namibia national rugby union team, from 2004 to 2007, with 2 tries scored, 10 points in aggregate. He participated with the squad at the 2007 Rugby World Cup, playing in three games. He has been absent from the National Team since then.

References

1983 births
Living people
Namibia international rugby union players
Namibian rugby union players
Rugby union players from Windhoek
Rugby union props